Hypocapnia (from the Greek words  meaning below normal and  kapnós meaning smoke), also known as hypocarbia, sometimes incorrectly called acapnia, is a state of reduced carbon dioxide in the blood. Hypocapnia usually results from deep or rapid breathing, known as hyperventilation.

Hypocapnia is the opposite of hypercapnia.

Effects
Even when marked, hypocapnia is normally well tolerated. Symptoms include tingling sensation (usually in the limbs), abnormal heartbeat, painful muscle cramps, and seizures. Acute hypocapnia causes hypocapnic alkalosis, which causes cerebral vasoconstriction leading to cerebral hypoxia, and this can cause transient dizziness, fainting, and anxiety. A low partial pressure of carbon dioxide in the blood also causes alkalosis (because CO2 is acidic in solution), leading to lowered plasma calcium ions (Hypocalcaemia), causing increased nerve and muscle excitability. This explains the other common symptoms of hyperventilation—pins and needles, muscle cramps and tetany in the extremities, especially hands and feet.

Because the brain stem regulates breathing by monitoring the level of blood CO2 instead of O2, hypocapnia can suppress breathing to the point of blackout from cerebral hypoxia, as exhibited in shallow water blackout.

Hypocapnia also results in bronchoconstriction in order to decrease ventilation. This mechanism is meant to counteract hyperventilation, and decrease the amount of oxygen coming into the lungs. The body's "goal" is to have a relatively even ratio of the partial pressure of oxygen to the partial pressure of carbon dioxide. Chemoreceptors in the body sense a change in partial pressures and pH (hydrogen ion concentration) in the blood. Chemoreceptors are responsible for signaling vasoconstriction, vasodilation, bronchoconstriction, and bronchodilation.

Causes

The main physiologic causes of hypocapnia are related to hyperventilation. Hypocapnia is sometimes induced in the treatment of medical emergencies such as intracranial hypertension and hyperkalemia.

Self-induced hypocapnia through hyperventilation is the basis for the dangerous schoolyard fainting game. Deliberate hyperventilation has been used by underwater breath-hold divers for the purpose of extending dive time as it effectively reduces respiratory drive due to low  levels. This allows one to break their standard limit of breath holding, at an increased risk of shallow water blackout (which is a significant cause of drownings). This risk is caused to due to air hunger being reduced (due to low blood carbon dioxide levels) but oxygen levels not being increased. In fact hypocapnia reduces the oxygen levels available to the brain due to the elevated affinity of oxygen to hemoglobin (Bohr effect) hence highly increasing the chances of blackout.

Diagnosis

Neonatal infants 
Monitoring the level of carbon dioxide in neonatal infants to ensure that the level is not too high (hypercarbia) or too low is important for improving outcomes for neonates in intensive care. Carbon dioxide can be monitored by taking a blood sample (arterial blood gas), through the breath (exhalation), and it can be measured continuously through the skin by using a minimally invasive transcutaneous device. The most effective and safest approach for measuring carbon dioxide in newborn infants is not clear.

See also
 , where hyperventilation and the subsequent hypocapnia is a cause
 , increased level of carbon dioxide
 , which is often associated with hypocapnia

References

External links 

Symptoms and signs: Respiratory system